The New South Wales Minister for Police is a minister in the Government of New South Wales who has responsibilities which include the conduct and regulation of all police and services agencies and personnel and also deals with operational and event planning issues, and fire and rescue services in New South Wales, Australia. The Minister also serves as the Vice-Patron of NSW Police Legacy.

The current Minister for Police is Paul Toole, since 21 December 2021. Toole also serves as the Deputy Premier of New South Wales and the Minister for Regional New South Wales, since 6 October 2021.

On the 21 December 2021 upon the appointment of Steph Cooke as the Minister for Emergency Services and Resilience the portfolio for the Minister of Police and Emergency Services was split. 

The ministers administer the portfolio through the Communities and Justice cluster, in particular through the Department of Communities  and Justice, a department of the Government of New South Wales, and additional agencies including the New South Wales Crime Commission, the New South Wales Police Force and the Police Integrity Commission

Ultimately the ministers are responsible to Parliament of New South Wales.

List of ministers

Police 
The following individuals have served as Ministers for Police, or any precedent titles:

See also 

List of New South Wales government agencies

References

Police
New South Wales